Cenchrus setiger (syn. Pennisetum setigerum), the birdwood grass, is a species in the grass family Poaceae. It native to drier parts of Africa, the Arabian Peninsula, Iran, India, and as far as Myanmar, and has been introduced to the United States, Brazil, and Australia. Drought-tolerant and quite palatable to livestock, it is a valuable fodder and forage in areas that get as little as 200 mm of rain per year, but its productivity is low.

References

setiger
Fodder
Forages
Flora of Senegal
Flora of Mauritania
Flora of Algeria
Flora of Burkina Faso
Flora of Ghana
Flora of Niger
Flora of Egypt
Flora of Northeast Tropical Africa
Flora of Socotra
Flora of East Tropical Africa
Flora of the Arabian Peninsula
Flora of Iran
Flora of Pakistan
Flora of India (region)
Flora of the Andaman Islands
Flora of the Nicobar Islands
Flora of Myanmar
Plants described in 1806